Streptomyces coeruleoflavus is a bacterium species from the genus of Streptomyces.

See also 
 List of Streptomyces species

References

Further reading 
 

coeruleoflavus
Bacteria described in 1986